Everyman Theatre is the name of a number of theatres:

Europe 
Everyman Theatre, Cheltenham, a theatre in Gloucestershire
Everyman Theatre, Liverpool, a theatre in Liverpool, England
Everyman Cinema, Hampstead, a cinema in Hampstead, London, formerly the Everyman Theatre (1920–26)
Everyman Palace Theatre, a theatre in Cork, Ireland

United States 
Everyman Theatre, Baltimore, a theatre in Maryland, US

See also
Everyman Cinema (disambiguation)